Charles Wiard (27 October 1909 – 30 November 1994) was a British sprinter. He competed in the men's 4 × 100 metres relay at the 1936 Summer Olympics.

References

1909 births
1994 deaths
Athletes (track and field) at the 1936 Summer Olympics
British male sprinters
Olympic athletes of Great Britain
Place of birth missing